"Real Men" is a song by British singer-songwriter and musician Joe Jackson, which was released in 1982 as the lead single from his fifth studio album Night and Day. It was written by Jackson, and produced by Jackson and David Kershenbaum. The song became a hit only in the Dutch language area and Australia. In the Dutch Top 40 it reached the 15th position, and in the Flemish Radio 2 Top 30 it reached the 25th position. "Real Men" reached No. 89 in the UK and No. 6 in Australia. A music video was filmed to promote the single, directed by Steve Barron. The song was covered by Tori Amos on her 2001 album of gender-swapped covers, Strange Little Girls.

Background
Jackson has described "Real Men" as being about the "age old battle of the sexes". He told Billboard in 1982: "I think your average male has had his masculinity and supremacy threatened to the point where he's not sure what it is he's supposed to do. Intelligent, forward thinking, in the sexual arena, is being done by women. It's all about the way stereotypes have reversed, turned upside down and become meaningless." The song has also been described as examining the themes of sexuality and male sexual attraction to other men.

Critical reception
In a review of Night and Day, Susan Molloy of The Sydney Morning Herald described "Real Men" as "lyrically one of the most outrageous songs for a long time" which "seemingly ends with a plea for grass-roots heterosexuality". Mike Day of The Age considered "Real Men" to be a "superbly grandiose creation" with "Phil Spector-style piano", a "wailing vocal chorus that is vintage Springsteen", "echoing drums" and lyrics that "cut a swathe through male chauvinism".

Alan Kellogg of the Edmonton Journal noted the "sheer lyric depth" and "brittle intensity", adding it was "a song for the Eighties if there ever was one". Stephen Holden of Rolling Stone commented: "The album's loveliest song, "Real Men," solemnly blends string chamber music with echoes of Phil Spector, as Jackson sorts out the contradiction between the traditional male role of warrior and today's macho gay culture."

In 2015, Kevin Wuench of Tampa Bay Times said of the song's lyrical message: ""Real Men" is not so much pro-gay song but more an open-ended song that asks the listener to make their own definition of what makes a real man". Stephen Thomas Erlewine of AllMusic described the song as "haunting" in a retrospective review of Night and Day.

Track listing
7-inch single
"Real Men" - 4:03
"Chinatown" - 4:26

12-inch single (The Real Men E.P., Dutch release)
"Real Men" - 4:05
"El Cancer" - 6:06
"El Blanco" - 3:52
"Un Otro Mundo" - 4:00

Personnel
 Joe Jackson – vocals, keyboards
 Graham Maby – bass
 Larry Tolfree – drums
 Sue Hadjopoulos – percussion
 Ed Rynesdal – violin

Production
 Joe Jackson – producer, mixing
 David Kershenbaum – producer, mixing
 Michael Ewasko – engineer

Other
 Gary Green – photography

Charts

Weekly charts

Year-end charts

References

1982 songs
1982 singles
Joe Jackson (musician) songs
LGBT-related songs
Songs about New York City
Songs written by Joe Jackson (musician)
Song recordings produced by David Kershenbaum
A&M Records singles
Music videos directed by Steve Barron